The 1996–97 Irish League Cup (known as the Wilkinson Sword League Cup for sponsorship reasons) was the 11th edition of Northern Ireland's secondary football knock-out cup competition. It concluded on 15 October 1996 with the final.

Portadown were the defending champions after their first League Cup win last season; a 2–1 victory over Crusaders in the previous final. This season they went out in the semi-finals to Glentoran. Crusaders were victorious in the final this time, lifting the cup for the first time with a 1–0 victory over Glentoran.

First round

|}

Second round

|}

Quarter-finals

|}

Semi-finals

|}

Final

References

Lea
1996–97 domestic association football cups
1996–97